Remember is the second Korean album by South Korean boy band Big Bang, released by YG Entertainment on November 5, 2008. Before release, demand for the album made it surpass 200,000 pre-orders. "Sunset Glow", originally by artist Lee Moon-sae, served as the title track for the album. During the 2008 KBS Music Festival, BigBang performed the hit together with Lee Moon-sae.

"Strong Baby", Seungri's solo track, was released as the second single. The music video was released January 1, 2009. At the 18th Seoul Music Awards a month later, the album received the Best Album Award.

Promotion
Two music videos from the album were released for "Sunset Glow" and "Strong Baby." "Sunset Glow" was promoted with the entire group, while member Seungri performed "Strong Baby" solo. Seungri would later go on to receive the triple crown on Korean music show Inkigayo.

Commercial performance 
On the year-end Hanteo albums charts for 2008, Remember was ranked as the 4th best-selling album in South Korea with sales of cover 135,000 copies on the chart. In April 2010, the album along with several of BigBang's other releases re-charted on the Gaon Album Chart, with Remember peaking at number 5 on the weekly chart and number 19 on the monthly issue.

Accolades

Track listing

Sample credits
"Oh. Ah. Oh." contains samples from Scatman (Ski-Ba-Bop-Ba-Dop-Bop) by Scatman John
"Sunset Glow" contains samples from "Sunset Glow" by Lee Moon-se

Charts

Weekly charts

Monthly charts

References

External links
 Big Bang Official website

BigBang (South Korean band) albums
2008 albums
YG Entertainment albums
Korean-language albums
Albums produced by G-Dragon
Albums produced by Teddy Park